Butea is a commune in Iași County, Western Moldavia, Romania. It is composed of two villages, Butea and Miclăușeni.

The Sturdza Palace, associated with the Sturdza family, is located in Miclăușeni village.

Natives
Pavel Cichi

References

Communes in Iași County
Localities in Western Moldavia